is a Japanese footballer currently playing as a defender for YSCC Yokohama.

Career statistics

Club
.

Notes

References

External links

1995 births
Living people
Japanese footballers
Association football defenders
J3 League players
YSCC Yokohama players
Sportspeople from Saitama Prefecture